Choghadak (also Romanized as Choghādak and Chaghādak; also known as Chagbadak, Choqābak, and Choqādak) is a city in the Central District of Bushehr County, Bushehr province, Iran. At the 2006 census, its population was 16,425 in 3,497 households. The following census in 2011 counted 18,072 people in 4,376 households. The latest census in 2016 showed a population of 18,702 people in 5,147 households.

References 

Cities in Bushehr Province
Populated places in Bushehr County